Bjarni  is an Icelandic male given name and may refer to:

Bjarni Ármannsson resigned as CEO of Glitnir (formerly Íslandsbanki) in May 2007
Bjarni Ólafur Eiríksson (born 1982), footballer (defender) from Iceland
Bjarni Benediktsson (born 1908) (1908–1970), Prime Minister of Iceland from 1963 to 1970
Bjarni Benediktsson (born 1970), Prime Minister of Iceland since 2017
Bjarni Bjarnason (born 1965), Icelandic writer from Reykjavík
Bjarni Friðriksson (born 1956), retired Icelandic judoka
Bjarni Fritzson (born 1980), Icelandic handball player
Bjarni Guðjónsson (born 1979), Icelandic footballer
Bjarni Herjólfsson (fl. 10th century) was an Icelandic explorer who sighted America in 986
Bjarni Jónsson (born 1920), Icelandic mathematician and logician
Bjarni Jónsson (artist) (1934–2008), Icelandic painter
Bjarni Thorarensen (1786–1841), Icelandic poet and official
Bjarni Tryggvason (born 1945), Icelandic-born Canadian engineer and a former NRC/CSA astronaut
Bjarni Viðarsson (born 1988), young Icelandic footballer
Kalli Bjarni aka Kalli Bjarni (born 1976), Icelandic singer and winner of Idol Stjörnuleit
Kalli Bjarni - Kalli Bjarni, album of songs by Kalli Bjarni

See also 

Bjarne
Björn

Scandinavian masculine given names
Icelandic masculine given names